Moan is a 1999 gay pornographic horror film directed by David Thompson, and written by Alex Nixx. It is based on the 1996 film Scream by Wes Craven and Kevin Williamson.

Plot 
While making popcorn, Kenny is called by an unknown person, who flirts with him. The conversation turns disturbing, and ends when a man wearing a hood and face paint breaks into Kenny's house, and rapes him. The next day, Kenny's friends discuss what happened to him, revealing that he was so traumatized from being sexually assaulted that he has suffered a mental breakdown. Investigating the attack is Deputy Derek, who questions Kenny's friends, all of whom have reasonable alibis. Derek then has sex with Ricky, and afterward Ricky mentions that Kenny had recently dumped Stuart.

After Derek leaves, dismissing a nosy reporter on his way out, Sam chats with Tom, and brings up Chris, his boyfriend who had been raped and murdered almost a year ago, supposedly by a man named Steve Warner. Sam goes home, and after masturbating he is taunted over the phone by Kenny's rapist, who then attacks him. Sam fights off his assailant, and accuses Brian of being him, as he showed up right after the attack, cellular phone in hand. Brian is arrested by Derek, but is released the next day, due to a lack of evidence, and Sam getting another call from the rapist.

Despite all that has happened, everyone attends a party being held at Stuart's house. Tom goes to get beer and light bulbs out of the garage, where he is confronted by and has sex with the rapist, who drowns him in a hot tub afterward. Ricky goes to look for Tom, and is locked in the garage by the rapist, revealed to be Brian, who is working with Stuart. Brian murdered Chris and framed his boyfriend Steve for it because Chris and Steve were having an affair, and now he and Stuart are going to kill Sam, after forcing him to participate in a threesome, as "no porno is complete without a good threeway". When the trio ejaculates, Derek and the reporter enter, and arrest Brian and Stuart, the reporter having recorded the two bragging about their crimes from outside.

Cast 
 Chad Donovan as Stuart
 Tommy Lord as Kenny Beeker
 Ethan Marc as Brian
 Blake Harper as Sam
 Jason Branch as Tom
 Doug Jeffries as Ricky
 Tom Southern as Deputy Derek
 Paul Dawson as Gary

Reception 
Jeremy Spencer of GayVN gave Moan a 3½ out of 5, criticizing the editing and direction, but still calling it "a fast-paced sexual romp that is both hysterical and creepy" with a cast composed of "powerhouse sexual performers and some decent actors". A score of 3/4 was given to the film by the Gay Erotic Video Index, which wrote, "It's a funny, campy spoof that is loaded with hot sex, over-the-top performances and a spattering of technical snafus". The film won Best Sex Comedy at the 2000 GayVN Awards.

References

External links 
 
 

1999 films
Films about rape
1999 horror films
Murder in films
American films about revenge
Self-reflexive films
American parody films
Gay pornographic films
Films about gay male pornography
Films about journalists
Films about pornography
1999 LGBT-related films
1990s pornographic films
LGBT-related horror films
Pornographic parody films of horror films
1999 direct-to-video films
American pornographic films
Direct-to-video horror films
Films shot in Los Angeles
1990s parody films
1999 comedy films
1990s English-language films
1990s American films
Gay-related films